Bantry Aerodrome is a small and privately owned airfield  west south-west of Bantry in County Cork, Ireland. The landing strip is near the coast, both runway ends are less than hundred metres away from the water.

The landing strip was constructed in the 1970s by the Rowa Pharmaceutical Corporation.

The nearest international airports are Cork Airport to the West, and Kerry Airport in Farranfore, County Kerry to the North.

References

Airports in the Republic of Ireland
Transport in County Cork
Bantry